Issoria baumanni, Baumann's mountain fritillary, is a butterfly in the family Nymphalidae. It is found in Nigeria, Cameroon, the Democratic Republic of the Congo, Uganda, Rwanda, Burundi and Tanzania. The habitat consists of grassland, marshy areas and forest margins at high altitudes.

The larvae feed on Viola abyssinica.

Subspecies
Issoria baumanni baumanni (Burundi)
Issoria baumanni excelsior (Butler, 1896) (Nigeria, Cameroon, Uganda, Rwanda, Burundi, Democratic Republic of the Congo: east to Kivu)
Issoria baumanni katangae (Neave, 1910) (south-western Tanzania, northern Zambia, Democratic Republic of the Congo: Shaba, Tanganika)
Issoria baumanni orientalis Kielland, 1990 (southern highlands of Tanzania)

References

Butterflies described in 1894
Issoria
Butterflies of Africa